Donald Marcievius La Greca (born February 13, 1968) is an American sports broadcaster and analyst. He is the co-host of The Michael Kay Show, heard on ESPN New York WEPN-FM and simulcast on the YES Network. He is also the radio host of the New York Rangers pregame and postgame shows, having served in the position since the 2005–2006 season. Additionally, he is the backup radio play-by-play announcer for the Rangers behind Kenny Albert. La Greca formerly hosted ESPN New York's official "Jets Game Day" pregame show and "The 5th Quarter" postgame show, alongside former New York Jets linebacker Greg Buttle. La Greca received the Distinguished Citizens Award in 2014, which honors Ramapo graduates for their personal commitment to advance higher education, and for their significant service to the community.

Broadcasting career

Today, La Greca continues to broadcast for the Rangers as the fill-in for lead play-by-play announcer Kenny Albert, although notable broadcasters Peter Rosenberg and Michael Kay have argued that Don is now the lead play-by-play announcer for the Rangers as he calls the majority of their games on ESPN New York. Don was given the opportunity to cover game one of the Stanley Cup finals in the 2014 season. La Greca had called NHL playoff games before for ESPN New York Radio but calling game one was "a dream come true" for La Greca. La Greca is a co-host for "The Michael Kay Show" and has been with the show since 2002. Starting in 2016, La Greca began hosting the ESPN hockey podcast, Game Misconduct.

La Greca is a native of Hawthorne, New Jersey.  He currently lives in Somerset with his wife Nancy and their 2 children.

References

American sports radio personalities
1968 births
Living people
American people of Italian descent
Ramapo College alumni
American talk radio hosts
People from Hawthorne, New Jersey